is a Japanese former football player.

Career
Yushi Mizobuchi joined J2 League club JEF United Chiba in 2017.

Mizobuchi announcement officially retirement from football in earlier 2023 after 6 years during professional career.

Club statistics
Updated to 7 August 2022.

References

External links
Profile at JEF United Chiba

1994 births
Living people
Keio University alumni
Association football people from Kagawa Prefecture
Japanese footballers
J1 League players
J2 League players
J3 League players
JEF United Chiba players
Matsumoto Yamaga FC players
Tochigi SC players
Kamatamare Sanuki players
Association football defenders